Stormed Port is a 12" EP by New Zealand band The Rip, released in 1987.

Track listing

Side A
River/Chasm   
Starless Road
Stormed Port

Side B
Entropic Carol 
Wrecked We Hymn

Personnel
Robbie Muir (bass)
Jeff Harford (drum)
Alastair Galbraith (guitar, vocals)

References

Alastair Galbraith (musician) albums
1987 EPs
Flying Nun Records EPs